Tilbroquinol is an antiprotozoal agent effective against amoebiasis. It has also been used against Vibrio cholerae.

References 

Antiprotozoal agents
Bromoarenes
Quinolinols